RPTS can mean:
Reformed Presbyterian Theological Seminary
Residential Property Tribunal Service
Republican Party of Labour and Justice